Mehmoodabad Ki Malkain  was a daily Pakistani soap opera which aired on ARY Digital.
Apart from some actors the serial included new cast and new actors. The show has also aired, on ARY Zauq in 2012, and in 2019 on ARY Zindagi.

Plot
The story revolves around Zahid Ahmed’s family, consisting of his three daughters, two sons, and his responsible wife Shah Jahan. Zahid has always been a failure to satisfy and fulfill his responsibilities as a father and as a husband and has been scolding his daughters for not following the Islamic rituals honestly. Whereas; his daughters have almost no inclination towards their father’s teachings and ultimately turns out to be rebellious against him.

The second plot of the story is concerned to Shabbir, the neighbor of Zahid and his 2 sisters; who are compelled to live in the house of Zahid for sometime due to some financial issues. Hence the title highlights the character of 5 girls of diversified nature, living under one roof.

Synopsis
Zahid and Shah Jehan have three daughters Nasreen, Yasmeen and Afreen. All of them has a world full of dreams. The family is very poor and they live in Mehmoodabad, one of the poorest area of Karachi.
Afreen is most loved by her mother which makes other sisters very jealous. Zahid is jobless and becomes a religious scholar and he scolds his children for not following Islamic rules. Yasmeen does a job in a factory. Meanwhile their elder son Nasir loves Shabbir's sister Sajida and wants to marry her. Other son Owais loves Arsala a rich girls and they both run away and get married. Afreen goes to sing a song in a club which results in a beating given by her mother.
Overall this drama focuses on the true colors of Mehmoodabad and describes the feelings of people and nature of true story.
living there.

Cast
Anita Campher as Shah Jehan
Shahid Naqvi as Zahid
Natasha Saleem as Sajida
Sajal Aly as Afreen
Saboor Aly as Rimsha
Farah Ali as Nasreen
Sana Ismail as Yasmeen
Babar Khan as Nasir
Naveed Raza as Owais
Farhad Farid as Shabbir
Zeeshan. As himself
 Asad Zaman Khan

Released
Mehmoodabad KI Malkain replaced Bahu Rani and it aired Monday to Thursday at 9:30 pm on ARY Digital

References
http://www.funmazalive.com/category/pakistani-dramas/ary-digital-dramas/mehmoodabad-ki-malkain

Pakistani drama television series
Pakistani television soap operas
ARY Digital original programming
Urdu-language television shows
2011 Pakistani television series debuts